Lebohang Thotanyana is a Mosotho politician and former Minister of Mining.

He has also served as club president of Lioli FC, chairman of the Lesotho Premier League and second vice-president of the Lesotho Football Association.

Politics 
He was appointed by The Leader of Lesotho Congress for Democracy, Mothetjoa Metsing, in 2015 as a Minister of Mining.

References

Living people
1970s births
Lesotho politicians
Government ministers of Lesotho
Lesotho Congress for Democracy politicians
Association football executives
University of Cape Town alumni
People from Teyateyaneng